Elections to the People's Council were held in Abkhazia on 13 February 1919, alongside parliamentary elections in Georgia.

Results
The Social Democrats won 27 of the 40 seats; 11 members of the party were Abkhazians and 11 Georgians, with the remaining five having other ethnicities. Seats were also held by social federalists, an Abkhaz independent socialist group, social revolutionaries, people's democrats and colonists.

Of the 40 members, 18 were Abkhazian, 16 Georgian and six from other ethnic groups.

Aftermath
Following its election, the Council split along ethnic lines, with Abkhaz members of the Social Democratic Party joining the independent socialists to form an Abkhaz opposition. Despite the split, the Council voted in favour of Abkhazia being an autonomous region of Georgia.

References

parliamentary
1919 in Georgia (country)
1919